= Kuch Gunjoan Ki Shaan Mein =

2000 book by Mahmud Khan

- First edition cover
- Author: Mahmud Khan
- Language: Urdu
- Genre: Fiction
- Publisher: M & R Publications
- Publication date: 2000
- Publication place: United Kingdom
- Media type: Print (Hardback)
- Pages: 224
- ISBN: 978-0-9537500-0-9
- OCLC: 50177009
- Followed by: The Logic of Half a Moustache

Kuch Gunjoan Ki Shaan Mein (ISBN 978-0953750009) is a 2000 book by British author Mahmud Khan, written in Urdu. The title literally means "In Praise of Baldness". It was written to address a perceived absence of humour in books written in Urdu, available in the United Kingdom.
